Stephan  may refer to:

 Stephan, South Dakota, United States
 Stephan (given name), a masculine given name
 Stephan (surname), a Breton-language surname

See also

 Sankt-Stephan
 Stefan (disambiguation)
 Stephan-Oterma
 Stephani
 Stephen (disambiguation)
 von Stephan